Bassey William Andem (born 14 June 1968) is a Cameroonian former professional footballer who played as a goalkeeper.

He spent most of his career career in Portuguese-speaking countries, mainly at the service of Boavista.

Andem won 31 caps for the Cameroon national team in nine years, being part of the squad at the 1998 World Cup.

Club career
Andem was born in Douala. After starting his professional career with his hometown club Union Douala (which included a loan spell at Olympic Mvolyé) he moved to Brazil, where he represented Cruzeiro Esporte Clube and Esporte Clube Bahia.

In January 1998, Andem joined Portuguese Primeira Liga side Boavista FC, where he engaged in an interesting battle for first-choice status with future Sporting CP player and Portugal international Ricardo. However, as the Chequereds' won the 2001 national championship – their only – he appeared in just seven matches.

After Ricardo left for Lisbon, Andem was restored as starter, losing the position midway through the 2004–05 campaign to new signing Carlos. He would regain his previous status after the Angolan was sold to FC Steaua București, totalling a further 43 league appearances in two seasons.

Andem played his last season as a professional in 2007–08, with Segunda Liga team C.D. Feirense, where he was second-fiddle. He retired at the age of 40, later working in directorial capacities at Union Douala.

International career
Barred mainly by Jacques Songo'o, Andem featured irregularly for Cameroon over eight years. He was selected as backup for the 1998 FIFA World Cup, also making the squad in three Africa Cup of Nations tournaments.

References

External links

1968 births
Living people
Cameroonian footballers
Footballers from Douala
Association football goalkeepers
Union Douala players
Olympic Mvolyé players
Campeonato Brasileiro Série A players
Cruzeiro Esporte Clube players
Esporte Clube Bahia players
Primeira Liga players
Liga Portugal 2 players
Boavista F.C. players
C.D. Feirense players
Cameroon international footballers
1990 African Cup of Nations players
1992 African Cup of Nations players
1996 African Cup of Nations players
1998 FIFA World Cup players
Cameroonian expatriate footballers
Expatriate footballers in Brazil
Expatriate footballers in Portugal
Cameroonian expatriate sportspeople in Brazil
Cameroonian expatriate sportspeople in Portugal